The Orono Bog is a bog that covers  and is part of the Caribou Bog complex in Penobscot County, Maine. The bog is in both the city of Bangor and the town of Orono. The bog is also partially protected as part of both the Bangor City Forest and land owned by the University of Maine. Orono Bog became a National Natural Landmark in 1973.

References

Protected areas of Penobscot County, Maine
Protected areas affiliated with the University of Maine
National Natural Landmarks in Maine
Orono, Maine
Landforms of Penobscot County, Maine
Bogs of the United States
Wetlands of Maine